Razgrad Province ( (Oblast Razgrad), former name Razgrad okrug) is a province in Northeastern Bulgaria, geographically part of the Ludogorie region. It is named after its administrative and industrial centre - the town of Razgrad. As of December 2009, the Province has a total population of 132,740 inhabitants on a territory of  that is divided into 7 municipalities.

Municipalities

The Razgrad province (област, oblast) contains seven municipalities (singular: община, obshtina - plural: общини, obshtini). The following table shows the names of each municipality in English and Cyrillic, the main town or village (towns are shown in bold), and the population of each as of 2009.

Demographics

The following table represents the change of the population in the province after World War II. Since 1992 the former municipality of Senovo has been detached from the Razgrad Province and the numbers in the table reflect this separation:

Ethnic groups

The population of Razgrad Province is ethnically mixed, with a slight Turkish majority.
According to the 2001 census, the main ethnic group are the Bulgarians (67,069), the Turks (71,963) and the Roma (8,733).

Total population (2011 census): 125 190

Ethnic groups (2011 census):
Identified themselves: 114,475 people:
 Turks: 57,261 (50,02%)
 Bulgarians: 49,229 (43,00%)
 Romani:  5,719 (5,00%)
 Others and indefinable: 2,266 (1,98%)

A further 10,000 people in Razgrad Province did not declare their ethnic group at the 2011 census.

Religion
Religious adherence in the province according to 2001 census:

See also
Provinces of Bulgaria
List of villages in Razgrad Province

References

External links
 Official site 

 
Provinces of Bulgaria
Turkish communities outside Turkey